The 2016–17 Idaho State Bengals men's basketball team represented Idaho State University during the 2016–17 NCAA Division I men's basketball season. The Bengals, led by fifth-year head coach Bill Evans, played their home games at Holt Arena and Reed Gym in Pocatello, Idaho and were members of the Big Sky Conference. They finished the season 5–26, 3–15 in Big Sky play to finish in a tie for 11th place. As the No. 10 seed in the Big Sky tournament, they lost in the first round to Sacramento State.

Previous season
The Bengals finished the 2015–16 season 16–15, 11–7 in Big Sky play to finish in fourth place. They lost in the quarterfinals of the Big Sky tournament to North Dakota.

Offseason

Departures

Incoming transfers

2016 recruiting class

Roster

Schedule and results

|-
!colspan=9 style=| Exhibition

|-
!colspan=9 style=| Non-conference regular season

|-
!colspan=9 style=| Big Sky regular season

|-
!colspan=9 style=| Big Sky tournament

References

Idaho State Bengals men's basketball seasons
Idaho State
IIdaho
IIdaho